Michigan's 14th Senate district is one of 38 districts in the Michigan Senate. The 14th district was created by the 1850 Michigan Constitution, as the 1835 constitution only permitted a maximum of eight senate districts. It has been represented by Democratic Sue Shink since 2023, succeeding Republican Ruth Johnson.

Geography
District 14 encompasses all of Jackson County, as well as part of Washtenaw County.

2011 Apportionment Plan
District 14, as dictated by the 2011 Apportionment Plan,  was split between southern Genesee County outside of Flint and northwestern Oakland County in the exurbs of Detroit. Communities in the district included 
Waterford Township, Highland Township, Springfield Township, Brandon Township, Holly Township (including the village of Holly), Fenton, Mundy Township, the city and township of Davison, and the city and township of Grand Blanc.

The district overlapped with Michigan's 5th, 8th, and 11th congressional districts, and with the 43rd, 44th, 46th, 48th, 50th, and 51st districts of the Michigan House of Representatives.

List of senators

Recent election results

2018

2014

Federal and statewide results in District 14

Historical district boundaries

References 

14
Genesee County, Michigan
Oakland County, Michigan